Tim McGarry is an Irish comedian and actor from North Belfast in Northern Ireland. He was educated at St Malachy's College, Belfast.

He is a member of the comedy group Hole In The Wall Gang, and played "Da", a fictional Sinn Féin spokesman (later MLA), in the comedy series Give My Head Peace.

He has also hosted several radio programmes on BBC Radio Ulster, including weekly comedy quiz The Blame Game. For a number of years he provided a monologue played over the ending credits of the weekly politics show, Hearts and Minds, in the guise of a Belfast 'black taxi' driver.

McGarry is a humanist and in 2016 was appointed a patron of Humanists UK and Northern Ireland Humanists, its branch working for a secular state and the promotion of humanism in Northern Ireland.

He is a fan of Cliftonville F.C.

References

External links 
Da Bio Biography of McGarry's "Da" character.
The Blame Game The Blame Game's official site via The Internet Archive
4THOUGHT Interview on religion and his Northern Irish upbringing

Living people
British humanists
Male television actors from Northern Ireland
Male comedians from Northern Ireland
People educated at St Malachy's College
Stand-up comedians from Northern Ireland
Satirists from Northern Ireland
Comedy writers from Northern Ireland
Atheists from Northern Ireland
Television editors from Northern Ireland
Secular humanists
1964 births
Television writers from Northern Ireland
Comedians from Belfast
British male television writers